Ek Kunwari Ek Kunwara is a 1973 Bollywood drama film directed by Prakash Mehra. The film stars Rakesh Roshan, Leena Chandavarkar, Kumkum, Pran.

Cast
Rakesh Roshan as Harish Bhatia
Leena Chandavarkar as Neela
Kumkum as Tara
Pran as Deepak
Raj Mehra as Deepak & Neela's Father
Rajendranath as Bhola
Jankidas as Mr. Verma
Lalita Kumari as Mrs. Verma
Yunus Parvez as Inspector Khan
Sunder as  Shambhu
Ram Sethi as Tenant
Jugal Kishore as Tenant
Goga Kapoor as Chandu

Soundtrack
Music given by Kalyanji-Anandji, lyrics by Majrooh Sultanpuri and Prakash Mehra

 The soundtrack was released on LP.

References

External links
 

1973 films
1970s Hindi-language films
1973 drama films
Films directed by Prakash Mehra
Films scored by Kalyanji Anandji